The Michigan Mega Conference was a large high school athletic league comprising twenty-eight schools which disbanded in mid-2009, with its former members either becoming independent or forming their own leagues. Member schools were predominantly located in suburban Wayne County, Michigan, mainly in Downriver. The other schools were located in neighboring Monroe and Washtenaw Counties. The schools were also members of the Michigan High School Athletic Association and compete in the organization's post-season state championships. Depending on the sport, the schools were divided into three or four divisions.

Controversies
When the MEGA conference was formed in 1993, many schools were denied entry into the conference. The repudiated schools alleged that this was because of their large black student population, the founding schools "discriminated in the formation and operation of the league." Consequently, current member schools Dearborn Heights Robichaud and Romulus filed complaints against the conference for denying their admission as members to the Office of Civil Rights (OCR) at the United States Department of Education. OCR determined that the athletic league violated Title VI of the Civil Rights Act of 1964. The schools declined a resolution offered by the OCR and subsequently sent the subject to the Justice Department in the summer of 1995. A resolution was succeeded by the eighteen founding members and the Justice Department to include the aforementioned schools and five others (Highland Park, Inkster, River Rouge, Ypsilanti, Ypsilanti Willow Run) encompassing an athletic conference of twenty five schools.

2008 football alignments

Red
 Allen Park
 Belleville
 Dearborn
 Fordson
 Monroe
 Southgate Anderson
 Truman

White
 Carlson
 Edsel Ford
 Kennedy
 Lincoln Park
 Redford Union
 Roosevelt
 Trenton
 Woodhaven

Blue
 Garden City
 Highland Park
 Inkster
 Melvindale
 Romulus
 Ypsilanti

Gold
 Annapolis
 Crestwood
 Ecorse
 River Rouge
 Robichaud
 Thurston
 Willow Run

List of MEGA Conference state champions

Baseball

Boys' basketball

Girls' basketball

 Boys' bowling

Girls' competitive cheer

Boys' cross country

Girls' cross country

Football

Boys' golf

Boys' gymnastics

Girls' gymnastics

Boys' ice hockey

Girls' soccer

Softball

Boys' swimming

Girls' swimming

Boys' tennis

Girls' tennis

Boys' track

Girls' track

Girls' volleyball

Wrestling

Disbanding
The Mega Conference officially disbanded after the 2008 season after members of the league began to fracture off and form their own conferences, citing a desire to have more geographically centered leagues, as opposed to leagues more focused around the schools' athletic strength.

There were 2 main conferences formed from the ashes of the Mega Conference, with those being the Western Wayne Athletic Conference and the Downriver League. However, a couple of schools chose instead to join the Southeastern Conference, while a few others chose to run an independent schedule.

References

Michigan high school sports conferences
High school sports conferences and leagues in the United States